Ströher is a German surname. Notable people with the surname include:

Franz Ströher (1854–1936), German hairdresser and businessman
Sylvia Ströher (born 1954), German businesswoman and writer

German-language surnames